The Caproni Vizzola Calif was a family of Italian sailplanes , the first example flew in 1969, with production continuing into the 1970s and 1980s. Of typical sailplane configuration with T-tails, they featured distinctive wings with centre sections of constant chord and trapezoidal outer panels. The forward fuselage was constructed of fibreglass over an alloy frame, while the rear fuselage, wings, and empennage were metal-covered.

The most significant member of the family, and the only one produced in quantity (around 150 by the early 1980s) was the A-21S, a two-seat version that accommodated the pilot and passenger side by side. At one time this aircraft concurrently held four world records for two-seat sailplanes, including:
 the women's closed-circuit speed record set by Adele Orsi and Franca Bellengeri in August 1974
 straight distance of 970.4 km by Ingo Renner and Hilmer Geissler in Australia in 1975

Variants
A-10 (one built)
A-12 (two built)
A-14 (one built)
A-15 (one built)
A-20
A-20S - two-seat version of A-20
A-21 - two-seat development of A-14
A-21S - refined production version of A-21
A-21SJ - jet-powered version of A-21 using either a  thrust engine, having a  ceiling. A trailing edge flap-airbrake is unique to this model. Marketed in America by AVIA America Corporation.

Specifications (A-21S)

References

Further reading

External links

tschager-gold.it

Vizzola Calif
1960s Italian sailplanes
Glider aircraft
Aircraft first flown in 1969
T-tail aircraft
Shoulder-wing aircraft